A luge  is a small one- or two-person sled on which one sleds supine (face-up) and feet-first. A luger begins seated, propelling themselves initially from handles on either side of the start ramp, then steers by using the calf muscles to flex the sled's runners or by exerting opposite shoulder pressure to the pod. Luge is also the name of an Olympic sport that employs that sled and technique. 

It is not to be confused with skeleton bob, which is also a single person tray-like sled in the Bobsleigh family, and the name of the sport that uses that sled, but which is designed for a running start, steering by shoulders and feet, and to be laid on face down and head first. While skeleton and bobsleigh are part of one international federation and sport, luge is organised separately by the International Luge Federation, FIL.

Lugers can reach speeds of over 140 km/h (87 mph), and is the fastest of the three 'sliding' sports. Austrian Manuel Pfister reached a top speed of 154 km/h (96 mph) on a track in Whistler, Canada, prior to the 2010 Winter Olympics. Lugers compete against a timer in one of the most precisely timed sports in the world—to one thousandth of a second on artificial tracks.

The first recorded use of the term "luge" dates to 1905 and derives from the Savoy/Swiss dialect of the French word luge, meaning "small coasting sled".

History

The  very practical use of sleds is ancient and widespread. The first recorded sled races took place in Norway sometime during the 15th century.

The sport of luge, like the skeleton and the bobsleigh, originated in the health-spa town of St Moritz, Switzerland, in the mid-to-late 19th century, through the endeavours of hotel entrepreneur Caspar Badrutt. Badrutt successfully sold the idea of winter resorting, as well as rooms with food, drink, and activities. His more adventurous English guests began adapting delivery boys' sleds for recreation, which led to collisions with pedestrians as they sped down the lanes and alleys of the village.

The first organized meeting of the sport took place in 1883 in Switzerland. In 1913, the Internationale Schlittensportverband or International Sled Sports Federation was founded in Dresden, Germany. This body governed the sport until 1935, when it was incorporated in the Fédération Internationale de Bobsleigh et de Tobogganing (FIBT, International Bobsleigh and Tobogganing Federation). After it had been decided that luge would replace the sport of skeleton at the Olympic Games, the first World Championships in the sport were held in 1955 in Oslo (Norway). In 1957, the Fédération Internationale de Luge de Course (FIL, International Luge Federation) was founded. Luge events were first included in the Olympic Winter Games in 1964.

Americans were slow to adopt the sport of luge. The first luge run in North America was built at Lolo Hot Springs, Montana, in 1965. Although the United States competed in every Olympic luge event from 1964 through 1976, it was not until 1979 that the United States Luge Association was founded. The first artificial American track was completed in that year for use in the 1980 XIII Winter Olympic Games at Lake Placid, New York.
Since that time the United States luge program has greatly improved. A second artificial track was constructed near Park City, Utah, for the 2002 XIX Olympic Winter Games at Salt Lake City.

Caitlin Nash and Natalie Corless, both of Canada, became the first all-female team to compete in a Senior World Cup doubles race in luge in 2019.

Artificial tracks

Artificial luge tracks have specially designed and constructed banked curves plus walled-in straights. Most tracks are artificially refrigerated, but artificial tracks without artificial cooling also exist (for example, in St. Moritz). Tracks tend to be very smooth.

The athletes ride in a flat, aerodynamic position on the sled, keeping their heads low to minimize air resistance. They steer the sled mainly with their calves by applying pressure on the runners—right calf to turn left, left calf to turn right. It takes a precise mix of shifting body weight, applying pressure with calves and rolling the shoulders. There are also handles for minor adjustments. A successful luger maintains complete concentration and relaxation on the sled while travelling at high speeds. Fastest times result from following the perfect "line" down the track. Any slight error, such as brushing against the wall, costs time. Track conditions are also important. Softer ice tends to slow speeds, while harder ice tends to lead to faster times. Lugers race at speeds averaging  around high banked curves while experiencing a centripetal acceleration of up to 5g. Men's Singles have their start locations near where the bobsled and skeleton competitors start at most tracks, while both the Doubles and Women's Singles competition have their starthouse located farther down the track. Artificial track luge is the fastest and most agile sledding sport.

Natural track luge

Natural tracks are adapted from existing mountain roads and paths. Artificially banked curves are not permitted. The track's surface should be horizontal. They are naturally iced. Tracks can get rough from the braking and steering action. Athletes use a steering rein, put out their hands and use their legs in order to drive around the tight corners. Braking is often required in front of curves and is accomplished by the use of spikes built on the bottom of the shoes. Tracks have a slope of not more than 15%.

Most of the tracks are situated in Austria and Italy, with others in Germany, Poland, Russia, Slovenia, Switzerland, Croatia, Liechtenstein, France, Turkey, Sweden, Norway, Romania, Slovakia, New Zealand, Canada and the United States.

The Upper Peninsula Luge Club in Negaunee, Michigan, is  the only natural luge track in the United States. The over 800 meter (half-mile) track features 10 full corners along its  vertical drop.

Canada has tracks in Camrose, Hinton Luge, Alberta, Calgary and Ontario Luge Club. The track in
Naseby, New Zealand is the only one in the southern hemisphere. The track is 360 meters long, and is open to the public through winter.

World championships have been held since 1979 while European championships have been held since 1970. In season 2015/16 FIL started with the Junior Worldcup.

Events
There are five luge disciplines.
Men's singles
Men’s doubles
Women's singles
Women’s doubles (debuts in 2026)
Team relay
These are further broken into several age classes - multiple youth and junior classes that cover the range of age 7–20, and general class (ages 21 and older).  Older competitors may enjoy the sport in masters (age 30–50), and senior masters (age 51+) classes.
In a team relay competition, one man, one woman, and a doubles pair form a team. A touchpad at the bottom of the run is touched by a competitor signaling a teammate at the top of the run to start.

Rules and procedures for races are very precise:
 A drawing is held to determine start order for the race. Athletes are assigned a number which is displayed on a bib. For most races, all categories race 2 runs. During the Olympic Games the Men's and Women's singles races are held over 4 runs. Conversely, Men's doubles is  2 runs.  The cumulative time of all runs is used to determine finish order. In all three events, the start order after the first run is determined by the outcome of the previous run, with the last-place slider sliding first, the next-to-last place slider sliding second, and so forth, with the leader of the previous run sliding last.
 Physical measurements of the sled are taken, and the temperature of the sled's steel blades is checked and may not be more than 5 °C (9 °F) above that of a previously established control temperature. Additionally, for artificial track races, the athlete must first be weighed. This is to determine whether the athlete is entitled to carry extra weight on their body while sliding. Additional weight is not allowed if the body weight of the front person and back person together exceeds . If there should still be a difference between the partner's weight and the  mark, the difference can be compensated according to an official weight table. Between runs, athletes are randomly selected for additional weight checks. Before each run, the sled (with the athlete, for artificial track races) is weighed at the start ramp.
 Once an athlete is on their sled, they are audibly notified that the track is clear. At this point, a tone sounds and the athlete has thirty seconds to begin their run. A run becomes official when an athlete and their sled, in contact with one another, crosses the finish line. If an athlete and sled are not within contact of one another, the athlete is disqualified from further competition. Disqualifications may also take place for any violation of rules and regulations. Certain disqualifications may be appealed.

Training
The sport of luge requires an athlete to balance mental and physical fitness. Physically, a luger must have strong neck, upper body, abdominal, and thigh muscles. Athletes also use wind tunnels to train.  Strength training is essential to withstand the extreme G-forces of tight turns at high speeds. Since lugers have very little protection other than a visor and helmet, they must be able to endure the physical pounding administered by the track when mistakes are made.

Risks
As with many extreme sports, luging has risks. Though most injuries involve bumps, bruises, broken bones and concussions, fatalities do occasionally occur. Georgian luger Nodar Kumaritashvili suffered a fatal crash during his final practice run for the 2010 Winter Olympics on the Whistler Sliding Centre in Whistler, British Columbia, Canada. Hours later, the International Luge Federation concluded that the accident was caused by a steering error and not a track error; nevertheless, changes to the track were made before the re-opening. Kumaritashvili was the fourth athlete to die while in preparation for a Winter Olympics competition, following speed skier Nicolas Bochatay, aged 27, who died while preparing for the Albertville 1992 games; and British luger Kazimierz Kay-Skrzypecki and skier Ross Milne, aged 19, who both died in the run-up to the Innsbruck 1964 games.

Governing body

The sport of luge is governed by the Fédération International de Luge de Course (FIL, 
International Luge Federation). The FIL is based in Salzburg, Austria, and includes 53 member nations.  It has traditionally had a dominant number of German-speaking representatives.

The following persons have been president of the FIL:
 Bert Isatitsch, Austria (1957–1994)
 Josef Fendt, Germany (1994–present)

Olympic medal table

Men's singles

up to: 2022

Doubles

up to: 2022

Women's singles

up to: 2022

Team relay

up to: 2022

Total Olympic Medals

up to: 2022

  including East Germany and West Germany
  including Soviet Union and Russian Olympic Committee

Fatal accidents

See also

World Luge Championships
World Luge Natural Track Championships
List of Luge World Cup champions
European Luge Championships
European Luge Natural Track Championships
Bobsleigh
Skeleton
Toboggan
Street luge

References

External links

International Luge Federation
Bob- und Schlittenverband für Deutschland/German Luge Federation
Österreichischer Rodelverband/Austrian Luge Federation
United States Luge Association
Natural Track: Upper Peninsula Luge Club of Michigan, USA
Brazilian Luge Federation
British Luge Association
Croatian Luge Federation

 
Winter Olympic sports
Racing vehicles
Racing
Sledding
Winter sports
Human-powered vehicles
Sliding vehicles
Sports originating in Switzerland